Jon Mills (born March 6, 1978) is a Canadian professional golfer.

Mills was born in Oshawa, Ontario, and spent most of his childhood in Belleville, Ontario. He developed his competitive game on the St. Lawrence Junior Tour in southeastern Ontario, and won the Ontario Junior Championship in 1996. He earned a golf scholarship to Kent State University, graduated in 2000, won the Ontario Amateur Championship in 2001, and turned professional later that year. His father David Mills served as Executive Director for Golf Ontario from 1997 to 2014.

Mills was a member of the Korn Ferry Tour (formerly known as the Nationwide Tour). Mills was a member of the PGA Tour in 2008, but did not finish high enough on the money list to retain his card for 2009. He was also a member of the PGA Tour in 2006, and the Nationwide Tour in 2002, 2004, 2005 and 2007. He also played on the PGA Tour Canada in 2002 and 2003. He won his first professional event on the Canadian Tour in 2003, and it helped him win the Order of Merit for the 2003 season. Mills earned his first PGA Tour card by finishing 5th on the 2005 Nationwide Tour money list. As a rookie on tour in 2006, he only made 6 of 27 cuts, and had to go back to the Nationwide Tour for 2007. Mills finished in 4th place on the 2007 Nationwide Tour money list to regain his PGA Tour card for 2008. Mills' caddie was Randy Dietz, a teammate of Mills at Kent State. Former British Open champion Ben Curtis also played with Mills and Dietz at Kent State.

Mills was appointed as the Men's Head Golf Coach at Kent State University in 2019.

Mills' brother Jeff played the PGA Tour Canada and is the Director of Golf at the Wildfire Golf Club in Ontario. His sister Jennifer is the Head Women's Volleyball Coach at Clarion University in Pennsylvania.

College Career - Player -  Kent State University

 4 Year Golf Scholarship at Kent State University.
 Mid American Freshman of the Year - 1998.
 Mid American Golfer of the Year - 2001.
 All Conference Team - 1999, 2000, 2001.
 Team won Conference Championship - 1998, 1999, 2000, 2001.
 Won 5 Individual College Championships, including 2001 NCAA Central Region Championship.
 6th in 2001 NCAA Championship.
 3rd Team All America - 2000
 1st Team All America - 2001
College Career - Men's Head Coach - Kent State University

 Team won 2021 Rutherford Invitational at Penn State University.
 Team won 2021 Mid American Conference Championship.
 Mills awarded 2021 Kermit Blosser MAC Coach of the Year.

Professional wins (5)

Nationwide Tour wins (2)

Canadian Tour wins (1)

Other wins (2)
2003 Toledo Open
2014 West Penn Open

Results in major championships

CUT = missed the half-way cut
"T" indicates a tie for a place
Note: Mills only played in the U.S. Open.

Team appearances
Amateur
1996 Ontario Provincial Junior Team.
2001 Ontario Willingdon Cup Team.
Golf Canada National Team - 1999 to 2001.
1999 Canadian Amateur Team - World Amateur Preview, Germany
Eisenhower Trophy World Amateur(representing Canada): 2000
2001 Canadian 4 Nations Cup - Won (Australia, New Zealand, Japan.)

Awards

 Score Canadian Male Golfer of the Year - 2007.
 Inducted into Centennial High School Sports Hall of Fame - 2007.
 Inducted into Kent State University Sports Hall of Fame - 2007.
2021 Kermit Blosser Mid American Conference Coach of the Year

Personal

Married - Megan

Children - Son Benjamin, Daughter - Emma

Resides - Kent, Ohio.

Parents - Dave and Judy Mills, Belleville, Ontario

Brother - Jeff

Sister - Jennifer

See also
2005 Nationwide Tour graduates
2007 Nationwide Tour graduates

References

External links

Canadian male golfers
Kent State Golden Flashes men's golfers
PGA Tour golfers
Korn Ferry Tour graduates
Golfing people from Ontario
Sportspeople from Oshawa
1978 births
Living people